The Bradshaw State Jail is a privately owned medium-security prison for men located in Henderson, Rusk County, Texas, owned and operated by Management and Training Corporation under contract with the Texas Department of Criminal Justice.  and it has an official capacity of 1980 inmates.  

This facility was first opened by Management and Training Corporation in July 1995.

As of August 31, 2020, the state placed this facility in idle status, due to the decreasing number of inmates during the COVID-19 pandemic.

References

Prisons in Texas
Buildings and structures in Rusk County, Texas
Management and Training Corporation
1995 establishments in Texas